59 Arietis is a star in the northern constellation of Aries. 59 Arietis is the Flamsteed designation. It is dimly visible to the naked eye with an apparent visual magnitude of 5.91. The star is moving closer to the Earth with a heliocentric radial velocity of −4.7 km/s.

The spectrum of this object is that of a subgiant star with a stellar classification of G7 IV, which would suggest it has exhausted the supply of hydrogen at its core and has begun to evolve into a giant star. It is around 1.7 billion years old with a projected rotational velocity of 1.8 km/s. The star has nearly double the mass of the Sun and almost six times the Sun's radius. It is radiating 20 times the luminosity of the Sun from its photosphere at an effective temperature of 5,044 K.

References

External links
 HR 995
 Image 59 Arietis

G-type subgiants
Aries (constellation)
Durchmusterung objects
Arietis, 59
020618
015514
0995